The Tombs of the Kings is a large necropolis lying about two kilometres north of Paphos harbour in Cyprus. In 1980, it was designated a UNESCO World Heritage Site along with Paphos and Kouklia.

The underground tombs, many of which date back to the 4th century BC, are carved out of solid rock, and are thought to have been the burial sites of Paphitic aristocrats and high officials up to the third century AD (the name comes from the magnificence of the tombs; no kings were in fact buried here). Some of the tombs feature Doric columns and frescoed walls. Archaeological excavations are still being carried out at the site. The tombs are cut into the native rock, and at times imitated the houses of the living.

The tombs have been known and casually explored for centuries. The oldest modern account was written by Richard Pockocke, in 1783. Almost a century later, in 1870 the first archaeological excavations were conducted by Luigi Palma di Cesnola, the Italian-born American consul to Cyprus. In 1915 the first excavations under scientific supervision took place, led by Menelaos Markides, who was the curator of the Cyprus Museum. Systematic excavations took place in the late 1970s and the 1980s under the direction of Dr Sophocles Hadjisavvas, former Director of Antiquities of the Republic of Cyprus.

Dr Hadjisavvas is preparing the finds for publication with assistance from the Australian archaeological mission to Paphos.

Part of the importance of the tombs lies in the Paphian habit of including Rhodian amphorae among the offerings in a burial. Through the manufacturing stamps placed on the handles of these amphorae, it is possible to give them a date and, through them, the other material from the same burial.

Thus, it is hoped to develop a more secure chronology for archaeological material in the Eastern Mediterranean of the Hellenistic and early Roman periods.

It is reported that much of the information related to the tombs was lost over time. Several factors contributed to that: It is believed that many of the tombs were rich in expensive grave goods, despite the fact that very few of such goods were to found by the official archaeological missions, and thus it is believed that grave robbers of the past were responsible. Also, the tombs’ proximity  to the sea side hindered the preservation of the buried bodies. Despite those obstacles, the historical significance of the Tombs is well established among experts and locals.

Gallery

References

External links

Archaeological sites in Cyprus
World Heritage Sites in Cyprus
Tombs in Cyprus
Cemeteries in Cyprus